Thalatta fasciosa  is a moth of the family Erebidae first described by Frederic Moore in 1882. It is found in India and in Taiwan.

Host plants 
The larvae feed on Hiptage benghalensis (Malpighiaceae), Aspidopterys species and Combretum species (Combretaceae).

References 

Calpinae